John Calvin Aker (June 3, 1939 – March 2, 2000) was a justice of the Kentucky Supreme Court from 1979 to 1986.

Career 
Aker was an attorney in Somerset, Kentucky who served as Assistant Commonwealth's Attorney, a District Judge of the 28th Judicial District covering Pulaski and Rockcastle counties, and a justice of the  Kentucky Supreme Court. Akers was appointed to the Kentucky Ethics Panel by Governor Martha Layne Collins.

References

Justices of the Kentucky Supreme Court
1939 births
2000 deaths
20th-century American judges